Jan Welter (27 February 1895 – 19 June 1960) was a Dutch weightlifter. He competed in the men's light heavyweight event at the 1920 Summer Olympics.

References

External links
 

1895 births
1960 deaths
Dutch male weightlifters
Olympic weightlifters of the Netherlands
Weightlifters at the 1920 Summer Olympics
Sportspeople from Amsterdam
20th-century Dutch people